The Dent du Salantin is a mountain of the Chablais Alps, overlooking the Rhone valley between Evionnaz and Vernayaz, in the canton of Valais. It lies in the massif of the Dents du Midi, east of Lac de Salanfe.

References

External links
 Dent du Salantin on Hikr

Mountains of the Alps
Mountains of Valais
Mountains of Switzerland
Two-thousanders of Switzerland